Willy Wonka and the Chocolate Factory may refer to:

 Willy Wonka & the Chocolate Factory, 1971 film
 Tom and Jerry: Willy Wonka and the Chocolate Factory, 2017 animated film

See also
 Charlie and the Chocolate Factory (disambiguation)
 Willy Wonka (disambiguation)

Willy Wonka